Syima Aslam  Hon. FRSL is Director and Founder of the Bradford Literature Festival.

Biography
Syima Aslam was born in Halifax, West Yorkshire, England, but moved to Bradford while a schoolgirl.

In 2012, The Guardian published an op-ed by Aslam, where she describes all the factors a modern Muslim woman has to consider when she decides whether or not to wear a hijab.

In 2014, Aslam and her friend Irna Qureshi founded the Bradford Literature Festival.

In 2019, the BBC News asked Aslam to sit on a six person panel to recommend the 100 "most inspiring" novels.

Awards and honours
Aslam was elected as an honorary Fellow of the Royal Society of Literature in 2019.

She was appointed Member of the Order of the British Empire (MBE) in the 2022 New Year Honours for services to literature.

References

Living people
Year of birth missing (living people)
Fellows of the Royal Society of Literature
People from Halifax, West Yorkshire
Members of the Order of the British Empire
People from Bradford